Asociația Fotbal Club Hermannstadt, commonly known as FC Hermannstadt, Hermannstadt or familiarly as Sibiu, is a Romanian professional football club based in the city of Sibiu, Sibiu County, which currently competes in Liga I.

The team was established in 2015 and introduced in the fourth division, with Hermannstadt being the equivalent of the city's name in the standard German language (i.e. Hochdeutsch). Roș-negrii achieved successive promotions and in 2018 reached the Liga I, the highest level of the Romanian football league system. 

During the same year, Hermannstadt also played a Cupa României final, which they lost 0–2 to Universitatea Craiova.

History 

AFC Hermannstadt was founded in 2015 to continue the long tradition of football in the city of Sibiu, started in 1913 by Șoimii Sibiu and continued through other teams such as Societatea Gimnastică Sibiu, Inter Sibiu, FC Sibiu, or Voința Sibiu. Even if Hermannstadt is not a moral successor to any of these clubs, it is currently the only representative of Sibiu in the first three leagues. Hermannstadt is the equivalent of the city's name in the German language, which has sometimes stirred controversy.

Immediately after the 2015 founding, the club was enrolled in the Liga IV. It finished first in the league table and subsequently qualified for the Liga III promotion play-offs. Hermannstadt won the phase without major difficulties, after 6–1 on aggregate against the champion of Gorj County, Gilortul Târgu Cărbunești. Sibienii were also winners of the Liga III – Seria V in the next season and promoted to the Liga II, the second level of the Romanian league system.

Hermannstadt played its first Liga II match on 5 August 2017, a 3–0 home victory over CS Balotești. It finished the campaign as runner-up, and thus achieved promotion to the Liga I after only three years of existence. The club also managed a notable performance in the Cupa României, being the first in 36 years to reach the final despite not playing in the top flight. Hermannstadt upset four Liga I teams en route to the last game of the competition—Voluntari, Juventus București, FCSB and county rival Gaz Metan Mediaș, respectively. It lost the final 0–2 to Universitatea Craiova, on 27 May 2018.

On 21 July 2018, Hermannstadt won its first ever Liga I match after Ștefan Blănaru scored the only goal of the opening fixture against Sepsi OSK.

Ground 
Hermannstadt's home ground, Stadionul Municipal, was built in 1927 and previously used by several other teams from the city. Its demolition started in 2018 to make room for a modern stadium, with Hermannstadt having since played matches at the Stadionul Gaz Metan in Mediaș.

Support
In its beginnings, Hermannstadt enjoyed the interest of about 4,000 fans. The team also has an ultras group, named D'acii, which appeared for the first time at a match against ASU Politehnica Timișoara in September 2017. Their name is a pun on the words dacii ("the Dacians") and d-aci, a contraction of de aici (meaning "from here").

Rivalries
Hermannstadt had a local rivalry with Gaz Metan Mediaș, referred to as the "Derby of Sibiu County".

Honours

Domestic

Leagues

Liga II
 Runners-up (2): 2017–18, 2021–22
Liga III
Winners (1): 2016–17
Liga IV – Sibiu County
Winners (1): 2015–16

Cups

Cupa României
Runners-up (1): 2017–18

Players

First-team squad

Out on loan

Club officials

Board of directors

 Last updated: 10 February 2023
 Source:

Current technical staff

 Last updated: 6 September 2022
 Source:

Notable former players

Romania

  Claudiu Belu
  Ștefan Blănaru
  Cătălin Căbuz
  Andrei Cordea
  Alexandru Curtean
  Răzvan Dâlbea
  Alexandru Dandea
  Lucian Dumitriu
  Srdjan Luchin
  Alexandru Mățel
  Ionuț Năstăsie
  Alexandru Răuță
  Bogdan Rusu
  Daniel Tătar
Portugal
  Cristiano
  David Caiado
  Yazalde
Brazil
  Jô Santos
  Romário Pires
Bulgaria
  Plamen Iliev
Congo
  Juvhel Tsoumou
Croatia
  Gabriel Debeljuh
Côte d'Ivoire
  Ousmane Viera
Switzerland
  Goran Karanović

Notable former managers

 Rubén Albés
  Liviu Ciobotariu
  Costel Enache
  Vasile Miriuță
  Eugen Neagoe
  Alexandru Pelici

Statistics and records

League history

References

External links

Club profile on UEFA's official website
Club profile on LPF's official website

 
Association football clubs established in 2015
Football clubs in Sibiu County
Liga I clubs
Liga II clubs
Liga III clubs
Liga IV clubs
2015 establishments in Romania